R58 may refer to:
 R58 (South Africa), a road
 Mini Coupé, a car
 R58: May cause long-term adverse effects in the environment, a risk phrase